The Becher Peninsula is located on southern Baffin Island in the Canadian territory of Nunavut. It is a part of the larger Hall Peninsula. Becher Peninsula is bounded by Frobisher Bay to the west, and Ward Inlet to the east.

Peninsulas of Baffin Island